The Clock Tower Museum is a museum, occupying the top four floors of the Abraj Al Bait clock tower in Mecca or Makkah, Saudi Arabia. The museum, located at the highest point in Makkah, is operated by the Misk Foundation, a non-profit organization established by Crown Prince Muhammad Bin Salman.

Departments 
The museum was first opened to visitors in May 2019. It has four floors where each floor represents a unique topic. The first floor shows the Makkah tower, its design and production stages. The second floor exhibits time measurements used in ancient days. The third floor explains how the sun, the moon, and the earth were used in the past to organize life and activities. The fourth floor depicts details of space and planets. There is also a balcony with a panoramic view of the Grand Mosque.

See also 

 List of museums in Saudi Arabia

References

External links 
 Clock Tower Museum

Tourist attractions in Mecca
Museums established in 2019
Science museums
Museums in Saudi Arabia